In seven-dimensional geometry, a pentic 7-cube is a convex uniform 7-polytope, related to the uniform 7-demicube. There are 8 unique forms.

Pentic 7-cube

Cartesian coordinates 
The Cartesian coordinates for the vertices of a pentic 7-cube centered at the origin are coordinate permutations:
 (±1,±1,±1,±1,±1,±3,±3)
with an odd number of plus signs.

Images

Related polytopes

Penticantic 7-cube

Images

Pentiruncic 7-cube

Images

Pentiruncicantic 7-cube

Images

Pentisteric 7-cube

Images

Pentistericantic 7-cube

Images

Pentisteriruncic 7-cube

Images

Pentisteriruncicantic 7-cube

Images

Related polytopes 

This polytope is based on the 7-demicube, a part of a dimensional family of uniform polytopes called demihypercubes for being alternation of the hypercube family.

There are 95 uniform polytopes with D7 symmetry, 63 are shared by the BC7 symmetry, and 32 are unique:

Notes

References 
 H.S.M. Coxeter: 
 H.S.M. Coxeter, Regular Polytopes, 3rd Edition, Dover New York, 1973 
 Kaleidoscopes: Selected Writings of H.S.M. Coxeter, edited by F. Arthur Sherk, Peter McMullen, Anthony C. Thompson, Asia Ivic Weiss, Wiley-Interscience Publication, 1995,  
 (Paper 22) H.S.M. Coxeter, Regular and Semi Regular Polytopes I, [Math. Zeit. 46 (1940) 380-407, MR 2,10]
 (Paper 23) H.S.M. Coxeter, Regular and Semi-Regular Polytopes II, [Math. Zeit. 188 (1985) 559-591]
 (Paper 24) H.S.M. Coxeter, Regular and Semi-Regular Polytopes III, [Math. Zeit. 200 (1988) 3-45]
 Norman Johnson Uniform Polytopes, Manuscript (1991)
 N.W. Johnson: The Theory of Uniform Polytopes and Honeycombs, Ph.D.

External links 
 
 Polytopes of Various Dimensions
 Multi-dimensional Glossary

7-polytopes